Sutton is an area of St Helens, Merseyside, and Ward of the metropolitan borough of the same name. The population of the ward taken at the 2011 census was 12,003.

Historically within Lancashire, it is one of the four townships along with Eccleston, Parr and Windle that formed the municipal borough of St Helens in 1868.

History

The old Township of Sutton included: Sutton Village, Ditch Hillock, Peasley Cross, Marshalls Cross, Clockface, Sutton Manor and Sherdley and totalled 3,752 acres. The exact derivation of Sutton is uncertain. It is thought the township took its name from 'Sudtun', old English for southern enclosure or south town and was likely to have been the southern portion of a Saxon thegn's estate. Before the Conquest of 1066 AD, Sutton was held by King Edward the Confessor and located within the Royal Forest of West Derby. This extended from Burtonwood to Crosby and in the 12th and 13th centuries, Sutton became part of the Barony of Widnes. Along with fourteen other townships including Windle, Parr and Eccleston, it became part of the large ecclesiastical parish of Prescot and its rich seams of coal, which were first discovered in Sutton Heath around 1540, transformed it from an area of moorland and forest into an area of mining.

Transport
There are two railway stations in the area. St Helens Junction, and Lea Green both operate services to Liverpool and Manchester.

Sutton Manor Colliery
Sutton Manor was one of the largest pits in the Lancashire Coalfield, the deepest of the two shafts going over  into the earth. The first shaft was dug in 1906. They were filled in shortly after closure using large diameter limestone, around 30,000 tons from Holme Park Quarry in Carnforth then capped with three-metre thick reinforced concrete plugs over the two shafts, with venting pipes for methane.

Landmarks

People and culture
The popular St Helens Show  or St Helens Festival as it had been rebranded on its final years, took place in Sutton each July at Sherdley Park, adjacent to The Sutton Academy.  The three-day St Helens Centenary Festival was held in the park in 1968. It marked a hundred years since the town became a borough and was then the largest event ever held in St Helens. The festival went so well that it was decided to hold a similar event each year. This was called the St Helens Show and was renowned as the largest free show in Europe. From 2007 to 2010 it was reinvented as the two-day St Helens Festival before being axed by St Helens Council.

See also
St Nicholas' Church, St Helens
Sutton Mill Dam

References

External links
Sutton Beauty & Heritage – Comprehensive history and present day beauty of Sutton and Bold in St. Helens 
Sutton Manor colliery 1990 – photographs of the colliery
Flickr Group Photographs of the site.

St Helens, Merseyside
Towns and villages in the Metropolitan Borough of St Helens